The National Olympic Committee of Sierra Leone (IOC code: SLE) is the National Olympic Committee representing Sierra Leone. It was created and recognised by the IOC in 1964.

Sierra Leone made its debut at the 1968 Summer Olympics in Mexico City where it was represented by three athletes.

Presidents of Committee
 11 May 2013–present – Patrick Coker

See also
Sierra Leone at the Olympics
Sierra Leone at the Commonwealth Games

References

Sierra Leone
Sierra Leone
 
Olympic